Father of the Bride is a 1949 novel written by Edward Streeter.

Adaptations
Father of the Bride (1950 film)
Father of the Bride (1991 film)
 Father of the Bride (2022 film)

References

Father of the Bride (franchise)
1949 American novels
American novels adapted into films
Works about wedding